Kim Won-Gyeong (born 27 January 1990) is a South Korean female  track cyclist. She competed in three events at the 2011 UCI Track Cycling World Championships.

Major results

2014
Asian Track Championships
2nd  Keirin
2nd  Team Sprint (with Lee Hye-jin)
2nd  Team Sprint, Asian Games (with Lee Hye-jin)
2015
Yangyang International Track Competition
1st Sprint
2nd Keirin
Track Asia Cup
1st Keirin
1st Team Sprint
1st 500m Time Trial (with Kim Soojin)
2016
Yangyang International Track Competition
1st Keirin
1st Sprint
2017
Asian Track Championships
1st  Team Sprint (with Lee Hye-jin)
2nd  Sprint

References

External links
 

1990 births
Living people
South Korean track cyclists
South Korean female cyclists
Place of birth missing (living people)
Cyclists at the 2010 Asian Games
Cyclists at the 2014 Asian Games
Cyclists at the 2018 Asian Games
Asian Games medalists in cycling
Medalists at the 2014 Asian Games
Medalists at the 2018 Asian Games
Asian Games silver medalists for South Korea
Asian Games bronze medalists for South Korea
20th-century South Korean women
21st-century South Korean women